Bernard II of Saxe-Lauenburg (c. 1385/1392 – 16 July 1463) was a member of the House of Ascania and Duke of Saxe-Lauenburg from 1426 to 1463. His full title was Duke of Saxony, Angria and Westphalia, however only ruling the branch duchy of Saxe-Lauenburg between 1426 and 1463.

Life
He was a son of Eric IV, Duke of Saxe-Lauenburg and Sophia of Brunswick-Lüneburg. Since long Bernard urged his ruling brother Eric V to share his reign. Failed in his fight for the Saxon electorate Eric finally agreed and made Bernard the co-duke of Saxe-Lauenburg in 1426. When Eric V died in 1435 Bernard continued the reign alone.

Bernard II reinforced Saxe-Lauenburg's claim to inherit Electoral Saxe-Wittenberg with the latter and Saxe-Lauenburg having been partitioned from the younger Duchy of Saxony in the 13th century. Following his great-great-great-great grandfather Bernard I, the first Ascanian duke of younger Saxony, Bernard II is counted as second.

In order to strengthen his claim Bernard adopted the Saxe-Wittenbergian coat-of-arms for Saxe-Lauenburg. The coat of arms shows in the upper left quarter the Ascanian barry of ten, in Or and sable, covered by a crancelin of rhombs bendwise in vert. The crancelin symbolises the Saxon ducal crown. The second quarter shows in azure an eagle crowned in Or, representing the imperial Pfalzgraviate of Saxony. The third quarter displays in argent three water-lily leaves in gules, standing for the County of Brehna. The lower right fourth quarter shows in sable and argent the electoral swords in gules, indicating the Saxon office as Imperial Arch-Marshal, pertaining to the Saxon privilege as Prince-elector, besides the right to elect a new emperor after the decease of the former.

The different quarters of the coat of arms, from then on representing the Duchy of Saxony, Angria and Westphalia (Lauenburg), were later often misinterpreted as symbolising Angria (Brehna's water-lily leaves) and Westphalia (the comital palatine Saxon eagle).

Marriage and issue
In 1428 Bernard married Adelheid of Pomerania-Stolp (1410 – after 1445), daughter of Bogislaw VIII, Duke of Pomerania. They had the following children:
 Sophia (1428 – 9 September 1473), married Gerhard VII, Duke of Jülich-Berg 
 John V (1439–1507).

Ancestry

Notes

|-

14th-century births
1463 deaths
Bernard 02
Bernard 02